Events in the year 1909 in Spain.

Incumbents
Monarch: Alfonso XIII
President of the Government: Antonio Maura (until 21 October), Segismundo Moret (starting 21 October)

Events
July: Tragic Week (25 July – 2 August 1909); a series of bloody confrontations between the Spanish army and the working classes of Barcelona and other cities of Catalonia, who were supported by anarchists, socialists and republicans.

Deaths
18 May - Isaac Albéniz, composer (born 1860)

Tobias Farrantè
Politician

References

 
Years of the 20th century in Spain
1900s in Spain
Spain
Spain